The 1984 European Competition for Women's Football final was a two-legged football tie to determine the winner of the 1984 European Competition for Women's Football. It was the first UEFA Women's Championship final, UEFA's top football competition for women's national teams. The match was contested by Sweden and England at Ullevi, Gothenburg, on 12 May 1984, and at Kenilworth Road, Luton, on 27 May 1984.

Watched by a crowd of 5,552 at Ullevi, dominant Sweden took the lead in the first leg when Pia Sundhage scored in the 57th minute. A crowd of 2,567 at Kenilworth Road watched England level the tie though Linda Curl's 31st minute goal in extremely wet and muddy conditions. Sweden then beat England 4–3 on penalties to secure the inaugural UEFA Women's Championship.

Match details

First leg

Second leg

Match

Summary

The final was tense 2 legged game which ended in defeat from England via a penalty shootout. The games were not broadcast on British television due to a lack of interest.

References

External links

May 1984 sports events in Europe
Sweden women's national football team matches
England women's national football team matches
1984
UEFA Women's Euro Final 1984
Women
1984 in women's association football
1983–84 in English football
1984 in Swedish football
Final